Bethel Johnson (born February 11, 1979) is an American former professional football player who was a wide receiver in the National Football League (NFL). He was selected by the New England Patriots in the second round of the 2003 NFL Draft. He played college football for Texas A&M Aggies.

Johnson earned two Super Bowl rings with the Patriots in Super Bowl XXXVIII and Super Bowl XXXIX. He has also been a member of the New Orleans Saints, Minnesota Vikings, Philadelphia Eagles, Houston Texans and Toronto Argonauts.

Early years
Johnson attended Corsicana High School in Corsicana, Texas and as a senior, he led his team to the Class 4A state title game, and made 44 receptions for 1495 yards and 17 receiving touchdowns.

College career
Johnson attended Texas A&M University, and finished his college football career with 117 receptions for 1740 yards (14.9 yards per reception), and 11 receiving touchdowns. His 117 receptions and 1740 receiving yards both rank second in school career records.

Sophomore - 27 catches for 514 yards and 3 TD.
Junior - 42 catches for 440 yards and 0 TD.
Redshirt Senior - 40 catches for 718 yards and 8 TD.  He also averaged 21 yards per KR and 11.6 yards per PR.

Professional career

New England Patriots
Johnson was drafted 45th overall in the 2003 NFL Draft.  In his rookie season, ranked second in the NFL with a 28.2 yards per kickoff return average, returning 30 kickoffs for 847 yards and a touchdown, while also catching 16 passes for 209 yards and 2 scores. In 2003 and 2004 he won the Super Bowl with the New England Patriots.

New Orleans Saints
He was traded to the Saints on June 5, 2006 for defensive tackle Johnathan Sullivan, who was drafted sixth overall by the Saints in 2003. Saints coach, Sean Payton, questioned Johnson's "conditioning, his stamina and endurance" during the preseason.

Johnson was cut from the Saints before the 2006 regular season began after injuring his knee in a preseason game.

Minnesota Vikings
Johnson was then signed by the Minnesota Vikings on October 10, 2006. He appeared in 11 games with two starts for the Vikings that season, catching nine passes for 156 yards. He became a free agent in the 2007 offseason.

Philadelphia Eagles
On March 8, 2007, he signed a one-year contract with the Philadelphia Eagles. He was released on June 5, after he failed a physical.

Houston Texans
On July 9, 2007, Johnson signed with the Houston Texans. However, he was released on August 31, during final cuts and spent the rest of the season out of football.

Toronto Argonauts
On May 26, 2008, Johnson was signed by the Toronto Argonauts of the Canadian Football League. He was released on September 30, due to his lack of progress; ranking just seventh on the team in receiving with 16 catches for 189 yards and no touchdowns.

References

External links
 New England Patriots bio
 Toronto Argonauts bio

1979 births
Living people
People from Dallas
People from Corsicana, Texas
American football wide receivers
American football return specialists
Texas A&M Aggies football players
New England Patriots players
New Orleans Saints players
Minnesota Vikings players
Philadelphia Eagles players
Houston Texans players
Toronto Argonauts players
American players of Canadian football
Canadian football return specialists
Canadian football wide receivers